Serafín Dengra (25 December 1902 – 1966) was an Argentine middle-distance runner. He competed in the men's 800 metres at the 1928 Summer Olympics.

References

External links
 

1902 births
1966 deaths
Athletes (track and field) at the 1928 Summer Olympics
Argentine male middle-distance runners
Olympic athletes of Argentina
Place of birth missing
20th-century Argentine people